Mars Surveyor may refer to various NASA Mars probes:

 Mars Global Surveyor, single orbiter launched in 1996
 Mars Surveyor 1998, where NASA lost both probes: 
Mars Climate Orbiter (formerly the Mars Surveyor '98 Orbiter), and
Mars Polar Lander (formerly the Mars Surveyor '98 Lander) 
 Mars Surveyor 2001, of which there were also to be two probes:
2001 Mars Odyssey (formerly Mars Surveyor 2001 Orbiter), currently orbiting Mars, and
Mars Surveyor 2001 Lander, cancelled in May 2000